The Browning Version is a 1994 film directed by Mike Figgis and starring Albert Finney, Greta Scacchi and Matthew Modine. The film is based on the 1948 stage play of the same name by Terence Rattigan, which was previously adapted for film under the same name in 1951.

Plot
Andrew Crocker-Harris (Albert Finney) is a veteran teacher of Greek and Latin at a British public school. After nearly 20 years of service, he is being forced to retire on the pretext of his health, and perhaps may not even be given a pension. He is disliked or ignored by the other teachers and while his pupils fear his relentlessly strict discipline, they are bored by his dictatorial but dreary and uninspiring teaching methods. His younger wife Laura (Greta Scacchi), whom he has sexually and emotionally neglected, is unfaithful, and now lives to wound him any way she can. She is having an affair with Frank (Matthew Modine), an eager, young American science teacher who is highly popular with his pupils, much more lenient with classroom rules yet is able to connect with the pupils. In his final class, Andrew, while reading from a Greek play, finally shows some genuine passion about the subject, giving a glimpse at the teacher he could have been. Andrew's nervous new replacement Tom (Julian Sands) expresses his awe at the ironclad control that the former exerts over his classes, but Andrew advises his young colleague not to follow his example.

As his retirement at the end of the school term draws near, Andrew is approached by a quiet and sensitive pupil named Taplow who has detected the unhappiness and loneliness of his teacher and makes an attempt to reach out to him, saying that Andrew's Latin teachings have inspired him. Taplow gives Andrew a gift – a rare copy of an early edition of the 'Browning Version' – the 1877 translation by Robert Browning of Aeschylus’ ancient play Agamemnon. Touched by this gesture, Andrew's emotional guard begins to be let down for the first time. Increasingly aware of Andrew's isolation, Frank feels guilty about the affair with Laura and ends the relationship. Shortly before the end-of-term school assembly in which Andrew will make his farewell speech, Laura tells her husband that she wants their marriage to end and that she intends to leave him.

The school's senior staff want Andrew to make his speech first, to be followed by the farewell speech of a younger, more popular teacher who is leaving to pursue a career as a cricketer. But Andrew insists on going second, even though the headmaster angrily says that it will give the ceremony an 'anti-climax'. To the surprise of everyone, including Laura who has lingered to watch the event, Andrew's speech is highly emotional and revelatory, apologising for his failures both as a teacher and as a person. Moved by the speech, the pupils and staff give Andrew a huge applause.

Andrew, as a parting gesture of gratitude, tells Taplow that he has organised a place for him in Frank's science class which the pupil had been eager to join. Laura has a newfound sense of respect for her husband and the two part on good terms. As he watches Laura drive away, Andrew sadly but calmly faces the next phase of his life.

Cast

 Albert Finney as Andrew Crocker-Harris
 Greta Scacchi as Laura Crocker-Harris
 Matthew Modine as Frank Hunter
 Julian Sands as Tom Gilbert
 Michael Gambon as Dr. Frobisher
 Ben Silverstone as Taplow
 Jim Sturgess as Bryant (as James Sturgess)
 Joseph Beattie as Wilson
 Mark Bolton as Grantham
 Tom Havelock as Laughton
 Walter Micklethwaite as Buller
 Jotham Annan as Prince Abakendi
 David Lever as David Fletcher
 Bruce Myers as Dr. Rafferty
 Maryam d'Abo as Diana
 Heathcote Williams as Dr. Lake

Production
The interior and exterior scenes in The Browning Version were filmed at Milton Abbey School and Sherborne School, two boys' independent schools in Dorset, in southern England.

Reception
The Browning Version received positive reviews from critics. The film holds a 78% approval rating on Rotten Tomatoes based on 18 reviews, with an average rating of 6.6/10.

Awards and nominations 
Nominations:
 Palme d'Or (Golden Palm), Cannes Film Festival (1994) 
 Best Screenplay, BAFTA Awards (1995)
Wins:
 Best Actor (Albert Finney), Boston Society of Film Critics Awards (1994)

References

External links
 
 
 
 

1994 films
1994 drama films
Adultery in films
British drama films
British films based on plays
Films directed by Mike Figgis
Films about educators
Films based on works by Terence Rattigan
Films set in schools
Paramount Pictures films
Films scored by Mark Isham
Films with screenplays by Ronald Harwood
1990s English-language films
1990s British films